Mani' ibn Rabi'a al-Muraydi is the oldest alleged ancestor of the House of Saud, which currently rules in the Kingdom of Saudi Arabia. He is thought to be a descendant of Banu Hanifa, one of the tribes of Banu Bakr ibn Wa'il of Rabi'ah of the Adnanites, while some claimed Man'i ibn Rabi'ah was descendant from the tribe of Uqayl. His original residence was the village of al-Duru', near the town of al-Qatif on the East Arabia coast.

In 1446, he visited his relative Ibn Dir'a in the village of Manfuha, near the city of Hajr (Riyadh) in Central Arabia. Mani' ibn Rabi'a later acquired land in Ghusayba and al-Mulaybeed, later merged and developed into a city called Diriyah, which became the forerunner of this family's territory.

Between 1654 and 1726, there was a fierce rivalry between the family's branches, namely Al Watban (descendants of Watban ibn Rabi'a) against Al Miqrin (descendants of Miqrin ibn Markhan), as well as wars against other rulers around Diriyah. The Al Miqrin branch under the leadership of Muhammad ibn Saud finally managed to consolidate power, by forging a close fellowship with Shaykh Muhammad ibn Abd al-Wahhab, to form the First Saudi State which manifested in 1744.

Genealogy

See also
 Muhammad ibn Saud
 Diriyah

References 

1400 births
1463 deaths
15th-century Arabs
House of Saud
City founders